Ryo Kanehama (born 13 January 1967) is a Japanese wrestler. He competed in the men's freestyle 57 kg at the 1988 Summer Olympics.

References

1967 births
Living people
Japanese male sport wrestlers
Olympic wrestlers of Japan
Wrestlers at the 1988 Summer Olympics
Place of birth missing (living people)
Asian Wrestling Championships medalists
20th-century Japanese people